Theodor Puff (21 November 1927 – 9 May 1999) was a German footballer who played internationally for Saarland as a defender.

References

1927 births
1999 deaths
Association football defenders
Saar footballers
Saarland international footballers
Saarland B international footballers
1. FC Saarbrücken players